Shimon is the original Hebrew pronunciation of the names Simon and Simeon. Among individuals, Shimon can refer to:

Given names
 Shimon Agranat (1906-1992), Israeli judge and President of the Israeli Supreme Court
 Shimon Amsalem (born 1966), Israeli basketball player
 Shimon Dotan (born 1949), Israeli filmmaker
 Shimon Gershon (born 1977), Israeli footballer 
 Shimon Iakerson (born 1956), Russian historian
 Shimon Moore (born 1982), Australian musician
Shimon Moyal (1866–1915) was a Zionist activist and physician
 Shimon Peres (1923-2016), Israeli politician and President of Israel
 Shimon Shetreet (born 1946), Israeli politician
 Shimon Ullman (born 1948), Israeli computer scientist
 Shimon (DJ), British music producer
 Šimon, a Viking warrior in medieval Russia
 Shimon Cheenikkal,a catholic priest
 Shimon Long, Tama Australia Sales Commercial Manager

Surnames
 Masato Shimon (born 1944), Japanese singer
 Ran Ben Shimon (born 1970), Israeli football player and manager

See also 

Simon (given name)
Shimun

Hebrew masculine given names